The 2008–09 Houston Rockets season was the 42nd season of the franchise in the National Basketball Association (NBA). Despite a season-ending knee injury to Tracy McGrady, the Rockets breezed past the Portland Trail Blazers in the first round, but could not defeat the Los Angeles Lakers in the second round. Dikembe Mutombo, who entered his 18th and final season, was injured in Game 2 of the first round and announced his retirement, ending his 18-year NBA career. Besides losing Mutombo, Yao Ming missed most of the second round due to a foot injury that required off-season surgery. Before the season, the team acquired Ron Artest (now Metta World Peace), who was known for his violent temper.  Following the season, Artest signed as a free agent with the Lakers. The Rockets would not return to the postseason until 2013.

Key dates
June 26: The 2008 NBA draft will take place in New York City.
July 1: The free agency period will start.
August 14: Ron Artest is acquired by trade from the Sacramento Kings .

Draft picks

Roster

Regular season

Standings

Game log

|- bgcolor="#bbffbb"
| 1
| October 29
| Memphis
| 
| Yao Ming (21)
| Luis Scola (13)
| Tracy McGrady (5)
| Toyota Center18,196
| 1–0
|- bgcolor="#bbffbb"
| 2
| October 30
| @ Dallas
| 
| Yao Ming (30)
| Yao Ming (13)
| Tracy McGrady (7)
| American Airlines Center20,066
| 2–0

|- bgcolor="#bbffbb"
| 3
| November 1
| Oklahoma City
| 
| Tracy McGrady (22)
| Carl Landry, Yao Ming (11)
| Tracy McGrady (5)
| Toyota Center16,996
| 3–0
|- bgcolor="#ffcccc"
| 4
| November 4
| Boston
| 
| Tracy McGrady (26)
| Luis Scola (9)
| Rafer Alston (7)
| Toyota Center18,291
| 3–1
|- bgcolor="#ffcccc"
| 5
| November 6
| @ Portland
| 
| Tracy McGrady (30)
| Tracy McGrady, Chuck Hayes (7)
| Tracy McGrady (8)
| Rose Garden20,611
| 3–2
|- bgcolor="#bbffbb"
| 6
| November 7
| @ L.A. Clippers
| 
| Ron Artest (23)
| Carl Landry, Yao Ming (9)
| Rafer Alston (8)
| Staples Center14,670
| 4–2
|- bgcolor="#ffcccc"
| 7
| November 9
| @ L.A. Lakers
| 
| Aaron Brooks (20)
| Luis Scola (9)
| Aaron Brooks, Tracy McGrady (4)
| Staples Center18,997
| 4–3
|- bgcolor="#bbffbb"
| 8
| November 12
| @ Phoenix
| 
| Tracy McGrady (27)
| Yao Ming (15)
| Rafer Alston (4)
| US Airways Center18,422
| 5–3
|- bgcolor="#ffcccc"
| 9
| November 14
| @ San Antonio
| 
| Ron Artest (18)
| Aaron Brooks, Yao Ming (8)
| Tracy McGrady (5)
| AT&T Center18,797
| 5–4
|- bgcolor="#bbffbb"
| 10
| November 15
| New Orleans
| 
| Yao Ming (21)
| Luis Scola (10)
| Ron Artest (7)
| Toyota Center18,303
| 6–4
|- bgcolor="#bbffbb"
| 11
| November 17
| @ Oklahoma City
| 
| Luis Scola (23)
| Yao Ming (12)
| Aaron Brooks (4)
| Ford Center18,145
| 7–4
|- bgcolor="#ffcccc"
| 12
| November 19
| Dallas
| 
| Rafer Alston, Tracy McGrady (16)
| Ron Artest (13)
| Rafer Alston (8)
| Toyota Center18,203
| 7–5
|- bgcolor="#bbffbb"
| 13
| November 21
| @ Washington
| 
| Tracy McGrady (20)
| Ron Artest (9)
| Ron Artest (6)
| Verizon Center20,173
| 8–5
|- bgcolor="#bbffbb"
| 14
| November 22
| @ Orlando
| 
| Yao Ming (22)
| Yao Ming (13)
| Rafer Alston (7)
| Amway Arena17,461
| 9–5
|- bgcolor="#bbffbb"
| 15
| November 24
| @ Miami
| 
| Yao Ming (28)
| Luis Scola (13)
| Yao Ming, Tracy McGrady (4)
| American Airlines Arena18,704
| 10–5
|- bgcolor="#ffcccc"
| 16
| November 26
| Indiana
| 
| Ron Artest, Yao Ming (19)
| Luis Scola (18)
| Rafer Alston (7)
| Toyota Center18,194
| 10–6
|- bgcolor="#bbffbb"
| 17
| November 29
| San Antonio
| 
| Luther Head (21)
| Ron Artest (8)
| Rafer Alston (6)
| Toyota Center18,282
| 11–6
|- bgcolor="#ffcccc"
| 18
| November 30
| @ Denver
| 
| Yao Ming (18)
| Yao Ming (11)
| Rafer Alston (6)
| Pepsi Center17,201
| 11–7

|- bgcolor="#bbffbb"
| 19
| December 3
| L.A. Clippers
| 
| Yao Ming (24)
| Yao Ming (10)
| Rafer Alston (7)
| Toyota Center15,358
| 12–7
|- bgcolor="#bbffbb"
| 20
| December 5
| Golden State
| 
| Yao Ming (33)
| Yao Ming (14)
| Yao Ming, Ron Artest (5)
| Toyota Center14,438
| 13–7
|- bgcolor="#ffcccc"
| 21
| December 8
| @ Memphis
| 
| Luis Scola, Rafer Alston (16)
| Luis Scola (15)
| Rafer Alston (8)
| FedExForum10,691
| 13–8
|- bgcolor="#bbffbb"
| 22
| December 9
| Atlanta
| 
| Yao Ming (24)
| Yao Ming (19)
| Rafer Alston (6)
| Toyota Center16,439
| 14–8
|- bgcolor="#bbffbb"
| 23
| December 12
| @ Golden State
| 
| Tracy McGrady (24)
| Yao Ming (14)
| Tracy McGrady (9)
| Oracle Arena19,276
| 15–8
|- bgcolor="#ffcccc"
| 24
| December 13
| @ L.A. Clippers
| 
| Yao Ming (24)
| Yao Ming (13)
| Rafer Alston (7)
| Staples Center16,203
| 15–9
|- bgcolor="#bbffbb"
| 25
| December 16
| Denver
| 
| Yao Ming (32)
| Tracy McGrady (14)
| Tracy McGrady (10)
| Toyota Center17,737
| 16–9
|- bgcolor="#bbffbb"
| 26
| December 19
| Sacramento
| 
| Yao Ming (30)
| Carl Landry (11)
| Tracy McGrady (8)
| Toyota Center18,271
| 17–9
|- bgcolor="#bbffbb"
| 27
| December 20
| @ Minnesota
| 
| Tracy McGrady (23)
| Aaron Brooks, Chuck Hayes (10)
| Tracy McGrady, Aaron Brooks (5)
| Target Center12,115
| 18–9
|- bgcolor="#bbffbb"
| 28
| December 22
| @ New Jersey
| 
| Yao Ming (24)
| Yao Ming (16)
| Aaron Brooks (6)
| Izod Center16,303
| 19–9
|- bgcolor="#ffcccc"
| 29
| December 23
| @ Cleveland
| 
| Rafer Alston (20)
| Luis Scola (8)
| Tracy McGrady (6)
| Quicken Loans Arena20,562
| 19–10
|- bgcolor="#ffcccc"
| 30
| December 26
| @ New Orleans
| 
| Yao Ming (19)
| Yao Ming (12)
| Tracy McGrady (4)
| New Orleans Arena18,326
| 19–11
|- bgcolor="#bbffbb"
| 31
| December 27
| Utah
| 
| Ron Artest (28)
| Luis Scola (14)
| Ron Artest, Luis Scola (4)
| Toyota Center18,245
| 20–11
|- bgcolor="#ffcccc"
| 32
| December 29
| Washington
| 
| Ron Artest (20)
| Yao Ming (8)
| Tracy McGrady (7)
| Toyota Center18,278
| 20–12
|- bgcolor="#bbffbb"
| 33
| December 31
| Milwaukee
| 
| Yao Ming (22)
| Yao Ming, Luis Scola (10)
| Tracy McGrady (10)
| Toyota Center18,228
| 21–12

|- bgcolor="#ffcccc"
| 34
| January 2
| @ Toronto
| 
| Von Wafer (18)
| Luis Scola (13)
| Rafer Alston (4)
| Air Canada Centre19,800
| 21–13
|- bgcolor="#ffcccc"
| 35
| January 3
| @ Atlanta
| 
| Carl Landry (18)
| Yao Ming (15)
| Rafer Alston (9)
| Philips Arena16,740
| 21–14
|- bgcolor="#ffcccc"
| 36
| January 6
| @ Philadelphia
| 
| Luis Scola (18)
| Luis Scola (17)
| Tracy McGrady (9)
| Wachovia Center14,858
| 21–15
|- bgcolor="#bbffbb"
| 37
| January 7
| @ Boston
| 
| Yao Ming (26)
| Yao Ming, Chuck Hayes (8)
| Yao Ming, Aaron Brooks, Ron Artest (4)
| TD Banknorth Garden18,624
| 22–15
|- bgcolor="#bbffbb"
| 38
| January 9
| @ Oklahoma City
| 
| Tracy McGrady (26)
| Yao Ming (7)
| Rafer Alston (6)
| Ford Center19,136
| 23–15
|- bgcolor="#bbffbb"
| 39
| January 10
| New York
| 
| Luis Scola (18)
| Luis Scola (11)
| Rafer Alston (6)
| Toyota Center18,280
| 24–15
|- bgcolor="#ffcccc"
| 40
| January 13
| L.A. Lakers
| 
| Von Wafer (23)
| Yao Ming (17)
| Rafer Alston (6)
| Toyota Center18,557
| 24–16
|- bgcolor="#bbffbb"
| 41
| January 17
| Miami
| 
| Yao Ming (26)
| Yao Ming (10)
| Shane Battier (6)
| Toyota Center18,369
| 25–16
|- bgcolor="#bbffbb"
| 42
| January 19
| Denver
| 
| Yao Ming (31)
| Luis Scola (8)
| Rafer Alston (11)
| Toyota Center18,199
| 26–16
|- bgcolor="#bbffbb"
| 43
| January 21
| Utah
| 
| Rafer Alston (23)
| Yao Ming (12)
| Rafer Alston (8)
| Toyota Center17,037
| 27–16
|- bgcolor="#ffcccc"
| 44
| January 23
| @ Indiana
| 
| Luis Scola (25)
| Shane Battier (12)
| Rafer Alston (8)
| Conseco Fieldhouse14,486
| 27–17
|- bgcolor="#bbffbb"
| 45
| January 25
| @ Detroit
| 
| Ron Artest (24)
| Ron Artest (9)
| Rafer Alston (10)
| The Palace of Auburn Hills22,076
| 28–17
|- bgcolor="#ffcccc"
| 46
| January 26
| @ New York
| 
| Tracy McGrady (20)
| Luis Scola (14)
| Tracy McGrady (6)
| Madison Square Garden19,155
| 28–18
|- bgcolor="#ffcccc"
| 47
| January 28
| Philadelphia
| 
| Tracy McGrady (24)
| Luis Scola (10)
| Rafer Alston (9)
| Toyota Center15,544
| 28–19
|- bgcolor="#bbffbb"
| 48
| January 31
| Golden State
| 
| Ron Artest (27)
| Yao Ming (11)
| Aaron Brooks (9)
| Toyota Center16,702
| 29–19

|- bgcolor="#bbffbb"
| 49
| February 3
| Chicago
| 
| Yao Ming (28)
| Luis Scola (18)
| Tracy McGrady, Ron Artest (6)
| Toyota Center16,653
| 30–19
|- bgcolor="#ffcccc"
| 50
| February 4
| @ Memphis
| 
| Tracy McGrady (21)
| Yao Ming (9)
| Rafer Alston (6)
| FedExForum10,109
| 30–20
|- bgcolor="#bbffbb"
| 51
| February 7
| Minnesota
| 
| Yao Ming (30)
| Luis Scola (10)
| Rafer Alston, Ron Artest, Shane Battier (6)
| Toyota Center16,815
| 31–20
|- bgcolor="#ffcccc"
| 52
| February 9
| @ Milwaukee
| 
| Aaron Brooks (23)
| Yao Ming (10)
| Tracy McGrady (5)
| Bradley Center13,904
| 31–21
|- bgcolor="#bbffbb"
| 53
| February 11
| Sacramento
| 
| Yao Ming (24)
| Yao Ming (18)
| Rafer Alston (13)
| Toyota Center15,626
| 32–21
|- bgcolor="#bbffbb"
| 54
| February 17
| New Jersey
| 
| Yao Ming (20)
| Yao Ming (12)
| Rafer Alston (11)
| Toyota Center14,921
| 33–21
|- bgcolor="#bbffbb"
| 55
| February 20
| Dallas
| 
| Yao Ming (22)
| Luis Scola (15)
| Aaron Brooks (8)
| Toyota Center18,195
| 34–21
|- bgcolor="#bbffbb"
| 56
| February 22
| Charlotte
| 
| Ron Artest (26)
| Luis Scola (10)
| Shane Battier (5)
| Toyota Center17,124
| 35–21
|- bgcolor="#bbffbb"
| 57
| February 24
| Portland
| 
| Ron Artest (21)
| Luis Scola (11)
| Ron Artest (5)
| Toyota Center17,515
| 36–21
|- bgcolor="#bbffbb"
| 58
| February 26
| Cleveland
| 
| Yao Ming (28)
| Luis Scola (9)
| Kyle Lowry, Aaron Brooks (7)
| Toyota Center18,399
| 37–21
|- bgcolor="#ffcccc"
| 59
| February 28
| @ Chicago
| 
| Ron Artest (32)
| Luis Scola (12)
| Aaron Brooks (7)
| United Center22,394
| 37–22

|- bgcolor="#bbffbb"
| 60
| March 1
| @ Minnesota
| 
| Ron Artest (23)
| Yao Ming, Luis Scola (11)
| Aaron Brooks (10)
| Target Center13,716
| 38–22
|- bgcolor="#bbffbb"
| 61
| March 3
| Toronto
| 
| Carl Landry (22)
| Luis Scola (16)
| Ron Artest, Aaron Brooks (5)
| Toyota Center16,291
| 39–22
|- bgcolor="#ffcccc"
| 62
| March 4
| @ Utah
| 
| Ron Artest (25)
| Yao Ming (7)
| Yao Ming (6)
| EnergySolutions Arena19,911
| 39–23
|- bgcolor="#bbffbb"
| 63
| March 6
| Phoenix
| 
| Aaron Brooks (30)
| Yao Ming (13)
| Yao Ming (6)
| Toyota Center18,045
| 40–23
|- bgcolor="#bbffbb"
| 64
| March 8
| Memphis
| 
| Yao Ming (24)
| Yao Ming (17)
| Kyle Lowry (9)
| Toyota Center16,179
| 41–23
|- bgcolor="#bbffbb"
| 65
| March 9
| @ Denver
| 
| Ron Artest (22)
| Luis Scola (15)
| Kyle Lowry (5)
| Pepsi Center16,020
| 42–23
|- bgcolor="#ffcccc"
| 66
| March 11
| L.A. Lakers
| 
| Von Wafer (20)
| Luis Scola (9)
| Kyle Lowry (5)
| Toyota Center18,449
| 42–24
|- bgcolor="#bbffbb"
| 67
| March 13
| @ Charlotte
| 
| Yao Ming (23)
| Yao Ming (8)
| Ron Artest, Shane Battier (4)
| Time Warner Cable Arena16,809
| 43–24
|- bgcolor="#ffcccc"
| 68
| March 14
| San Antonio
| 
| Ron Artest (21)
| Yao Ming (11)
| Shane Battier (4)
| Toyota Center18,300
| 43–25
|- bgcolor="#bbffbb"
| 69
| March 16
| @ New Orleans
| 
| Ron Artest (18)
| Luis Scola (12)
| Ron Artest, Von Wafer (5)
| New Orleans Arena17,723
| 44–25
|- bgcolor="#bbffbb"
| 70
| March 18
| Detroit
| 
| Yao Ming (31)
| Yao Ming (15)
| Shane Battier (5)
| Toyota Center18,275
| 45–25
|- bgcolor="#bbffbb"
| 71
| March 20
| Minnesota
| 
| Ron Artest (20)
| Luis Scola (9)
| Ron Artest (6)
| Toyota Center17,456
| 46–25
|- bgcolor="#bbffbb"
| 72
| March 22
| @ San Antonio
| 
| Ron Artest (24)
| Luis Scola (17)
| Luis Scola (4)
| AT&T Center18,797
| 47–25
|- bgcolor="#ffcccc"
| 73
| March 24
| @ Utah
| 
| Aaron Brooks (20)
| Yao Ming (13)
| Ron Artest (7)
| EnergySolutions Arena19,911
| 47–26
|- bgcolor="#bbffbb"
| 74
| March 28
| L.A. Clippers
| 
| Aaron Brooks, Yao Ming (21)
| Yao Ming (15)
| Kyle Lowry, Shane Battier (4)
| Toyota Center18,267
| 48–26

|- bgcolor="#ffcccc"
| 75
| April 1
| @ Phoenix
| 
| Ron Artest (28)
| Yao Ming (14)
| Aaron Brooks (5)
| US Airways Center18,422
| 48–27
|- bgcolor="#ffcccc"
| 76
| April 3
| @ L.A. Lakers
| 
| Ron Artest (21)
| Yao Ming (10)
| Aaron Brooks (6)
| Staples Center18,997
| 48–28
|- bgcolor="#bbffbb"
| 77
| April 5
| Portland
| 
| Yao Ming (21)
| Yao Ming (12)
| Kyle Lowry (6)
| Toyota Center18,214
| 49–28
|- bgcolor="#bbffbb"
| 78
| April 7
| Orlando
| 
| Yao Ming (20)
| Yao Ming (16)
| Ron Artest (7)
| Toyota Center18,389
| 50–28
|- bgcolor="#bbffbb"
| 79
| April 9
| @ Sacramento
| 
| Ron Artest (26)
| Yao Ming (9)
| Von Wafer, Aaron Brooks, Ron Artest, Yao Ming (3)
| ARCO Arena12,897
| 51–28
|- bgcolor="#bbffbb"
| 80
| April 10
| @ Golden State
| 
| Luis Scola (28)
| Dikembe Mutombo (15)
| Ron Artest (6)
| Oracle Arena19,596
| 52–28
|- bgcolor="#bbffbb"
| 81
| April 13
| New Orleans
| 
| Yao Ming (22)
| Luis Scola (15)
| Ron Artest (5)
| Toyota Center18,409
| 53–28
|- bgcolor="#ffbbbb"
| 82
| April 15
| @ Dallas
| 
| Yao Ming (23)
| Yao Ming (9)
| Kyle Lowry, Ron Artest (5)
| American Airlines Center20,350
| 53–29

Playoffs

|- align="center" bgcolor="#ccffcc"
| 1
| April 18
| @ Portland
| W 108–81
| Aaron Brooks (27)
| Dikembe Mutombo (9)
| Aaron Brooks (7)
| Rose Garden Arena20,329
| 1–0
|- align="center" bgcolor="#ffcccc"
| 2
| April 21
| @ Portland
| L 103–107
| Aaron Brooks (23)
| Yao Ming (8)
| Aaron Brooks (5)
| Rose Garden Arena20,408
| 1–1
|- align="center" bgcolor="#ccffcc"
| 3
| April 24
| Portland
| W 86–83
| Luis Scola (19)
| Yao Ming (13)
| Aaron Brooks (5)
| Toyota Center18,731
| 2–1
|- align="center" bgcolor="#ccffcc"
| 4
| April 26
| Portland
| W 89–88
| Yao Ming (21)
| Yao Ming (12)
| Ron Artest (9)
| Toyota Center18,271
| 3–1
|- align="center" bgcolor="#ffcccc"
| 5
| April 28
| @ Portland
| L 77–88
| Luis Scola (19)
| Yao Ming (10)
| Ron Artest (5)
| Rose Garden Arena20,462
| 3–2
|- align="center" bgcolor="#ccffcc"
| 6
| April 30
| Portland
| W 92–76
| Ron Artest (27)
| Yao Ming (10)
| Kyle Lowry (3)
| Toyota Center18,376
| 4–2
|-

|- align="center" bgcolor="#ccffcc"
| 1
| May 4
| @ L.A. Lakers
| W 100–92
| Yao Ming (28)
| Yao Ming (10)
| Ron Artest (7)
| Staples Center18,997
| 1–0
|- align="center" bgcolor="#ffcccc"
| 2
| May 6
| @ L.A. Lakers
| L 98–111
| Ron Artest (25)
| Yao, Landry (10)
| Ron Artest (5)
| Staples Center18,997
| 1–1
|- align="center" bgcolor="#ffcccc"
| 3
| May 8
| L.A. Lakers
| L 94–108
| Ron Artest (25)
| Yao Ming (14)
| Shane Battier (7)
| Toyota Center18,495
| 1–2
|- align="center" bgcolor="#ccffcc"
| 4
| May 10
| L.A. Lakers
| W 99–87
| Aaron Brooks (34)
| Luis Scola (14)
| Ron Artest (6)
| Toyota Center18,313
| 2–2
|- align="center" bgcolor="#ffcccc"
| 5
| May 12
| @ L.A. Lakers
| L 78–118
| Aaron Brooks (14)
| Luis Scola (13)
| Scola, Lowry (4)
| Staples Center18,997
| 2–3
|- align="center" bgcolor="#ccffcc"
| 6
| May 14
| L.A. Lakers
| W 95–80
| Aaron Brooks (26)
| Luis Scola (12)
| three players tied (4)
| Toyota Center18,501
| 3–3
|- align="center" bgcolor="#ffcccc"
| 7
| May 17
| @ L.A. Lakers
| L 70–89
| Aaron Brooks (13)
| Ron Artest (8)
| Ron Artest (5)
| Staples Center18,997
| 3–4
|-

Player statistics

Playoffs

Awards and records

Awards
Dikembe Mutombo, J. Walter Kennedy Citizenship Award
Yao Ming, All-NBA Second Team
Shane Battier, NBA All-Defensive Second Team
Ron Artest, NBA All-Defensive Second Team

Transactions

Trades

Free agents

Additions

Subtractions

References

Houston Rockets seasons
Houston